Janovce (German: Johannsdorf, meaning John's village) is a village and municipality in Bardejov District in the Prešov Region of north-east Slovakia.

History 
In historical records the village was first mentioned in 1261.

Geography 
The municipality lies at an altitude of 370 metres and covers an area of 5.551 km².
It has a population of about 415 people.

Genealogical resources

The records for genealogical research are available at the state archive "Statny Archiv in Presov, Slovakia"

 Roman Catholic church records (births/marriages/deaths): 1755-1895 (parish B)
 Greek Catholic church records (births/marriages/deaths): 1800-1895 (parish B)
 Lutheran church records (births/marriages/deaths): 1747-1895 (parish B)

See also
 List of municipalities and towns in Slovakia

References

External links 
 
 
Surnames of living people in Janovce

Villages and municipalities in Bardejov District
Šariš